Asrabad may refer to:
Asrabad, Ardabil, Ardabil Province
Asrabad, Kamyaran, Kurdistan Province
Asrabad, Marivan, Kurdistan Province
Asrabad, Saqqez, Kurdistan Province